Alan Lorimer Dowding (born 4 April 1929) is an Australian former first-class cricketer who played for Oxford University, the Marylebone Cricket Club (MCC), the Commonwealth XI and Free Foresters.

Dowding gave up a promising Australian rules football career when he was awarded a Rhodes Scholarship and moved to England. A South Australian representative at the 1948 Perth Amateur Carnival, Dowding was also league footballer with Sturt. He studied at Balliol College while at Oxford University and had previously attended St Peter's College and Adelaide University back home.

From 1951 to 1953, Dowding was a regular fixture in the Oxford University cricket team, usually as a number five batsman but also batting in the top order. In just his third first-class appearance, Dowding scored 105 against Nottinghamshire. He made it back to back centuries when he made 103 not out in a win over Free Foresters in his very next match.

His performances in 1952 were mixed, but he did score 69 against India. In 1952 he also played two first-class matches for the Commonwealth XI and against batted well against India, with a first innings 54 and 35 in the second.

Appointed Oxford captain in 1953, Dowding led the team in 14 first-class fixtures, including a match with the touring Australian team. He came close to scoring a century against Yorkshire but was bowled by Ray Illingworth for 99.

He played for both Free Foresters and the MCC from 1954 to 1956. He made just four half centuries from total of ten matches during that time, although his average in 1956 was a decent 44. While playing with the MCC in what would be his second last first-class match, Dowding took the only wicket of his career when he caught and bowled Cambridge opener Bob Barber. He was only bowling because Cambridge were chasing a small fourth-innings score, and his three balls also including the winning runs, off the bat of Ted Dexter.

Dowding married Jennifer Hughes in Aldingbourne, Sussex, in August 1954.

References

1929 births
Australian cricketers
Oxford University cricketers
Commonwealth XI cricketers
Free Foresters cricketers
Marylebone Cricket Club cricketers
Australian rules footballers from South Australia
Sturt Football Club players
Australian Rhodes Scholars
University of Adelaide alumni
Living people
People educated at St Peter's College, Adelaide
Cricketers from Adelaide
Alumni of Balliol College, Oxford